Beňov is a municipality and village in Přerov District in the Olomouc Region of the Czech Republic. It has about 700 inhabitants.

Administrative parts
The village of Prusy is an administrative part of Beňov.

Notable people
Antonín Cyril Stojan (1851–1923), Archbishop of Olomouc

References

Villages in Přerov District